Bohlokong Stadium is a multi-use stadium in Bohlokong, Free State, South Africa. It is currently used mostly for football matches and is the home ground of Super Eagles F.C.

Soccer venues in South Africa
Sports venues in the Free State (province)